Founded in 2001 by Rye Barcott, Salim Mohamed, and the late Tabitha Atieno Festo, Carolina for Kibera (CFK Africa) is an international non-governmental organization (NGO) based in the informal settlement of Kibera in Nairobi, Kenya. Registered as an NGO in Kenya and a 501(c)3 in the US, CFK is a pioneer of grassroots participatory development, and leads a community-based sports program, girls' empowerment centre, medical clinic, maternity centre, nutrition centre, young health and wellness centre, community-health outreach program, scholarship program, entrepreneurship and economic development initiatives, and a research-based initiative to improve educational quality in informal schools in Kibera. CFK is also an affiliated entity at the University of North Carolina at Chapel Hill and has an office in the university's FedEx Global Education Center.

Purpose
Led by Kenyans and advised by American and Kenyan volunteers, CFK's primary mission is to improve public health and economic prosperity in informal settlements in Kibera.

Philosophy
CFK's philosophy is grounded in the concept of participatory development. Solutions to problems involving poverty are possible only if those affected by it drive development. Concerned outsiders can help by mobilizing communities, advising, networking, and providing resources.  However, the local community possesses the knowledge and motivation necessary to solve its own problems.

Leadership 
As a registered nonprofit in the U.S. and a registered NGO in Kenya, CFK is led by executive director, Hillary Omala, who reports to a board of directors composed of both Kenyan and American volunteers. CFK co-founder, Rye Barcott, currently serves as the board chair. In 2020, CFK convened an advisory council, a diverse group of 15 international leaders, including 64th U.S. Secretary of State Madeleine Albright, former CDC Director Dr. Bill Roper, and former CEO of the Kenya Medical Doctor's Association Stellah Bosire, to help the organization improve and expand its services in informal settlements.

Awards and impact
Time magazine named CFK a "Hero of Global Health" in 2005 and ABC News named CFK co-founder, Rye Barcott, Person of the Year in 2006 for his work in Kibera and his service as a U.S. marine. Time for Kids featured CFK on the cover of its March 30, 2007, edition.
In 2004 Canadian Musician Sarah McLachlan concluded her award-winning music video "World on Fire" with footage of CFK's soccer tournaments and medical clinic in Kibera. Two years later CFK published LIGHTBOX:  Expressions of Hope from Young Women in the Kibera Slum.  This powerful book of narratives and photographs from disposable cameras gives voice to the young and courageous women of CFK's Binti Pamoja (Daughters United) Center.  In 2007 then Senator Barack Obama visited CFK's youth center and gave a landmark speech calling for ethnic unity and education in Kibera.  CFK played a crucial role in providing emergency aid during the Kenyan post-election violence in 2008, and for its efforts the Oklahoma City National Memorial and Museum honored CFK as its recipient of the Reflections of Hope Award in a ceremony with the former ABC World News Anchor Bob Woodruff and his wife Lee.

In 2008, CFK received a $1 million grant for capacity building and income generation expansion from the Bill and Melinda Gates Foundation. Dr. Jill Biden visited CFK's Binti Pamoja Centre in 2010 as she sought to promote women's rights, girls' empowerment, and gender equality around the world. In 2011, Barcott published It Happened on the Way to War, which juxtaposes military service and social entrepreneurship. The book was chosen as required reading for freshman classes at NC State University (2012) and East Carolina University (2013). In 2012, Kathleen McGinn of Harvard Business School profiled CFK as the topic for the school's first ever multi-media case study. McGinn joined the board of directors in 2014 and later served as CFK's board chair from 2017 to 2020. In 2012, CFK's Sports for Development program was the focus of the award-winning documentary, Without a Fight, which explored how soccer can facilitate social change in Kibera. Susan Mueni Waita, a participant in CFK's Girls' Empowerment Program, received a Queen's Young Leaders Award in 2016 for her work supporting girls and women in Kibera. She founded an organization called Making a Difference (MAD) Sisters to educate girls on sexual health. Most recently, Rye Barcott delivered the 2018 commencement address at the University of North Carolina at Chapel Hill.

History

CFK was cofounded by Rye Barcott (then an undergraduate at UNC studying under Anthropologist Jennifer Coffman), Salim Mohamed (a community organizer) and the late Tabitha Festo (a nurse). In the summer of 2001, Barcott teamed up with Salim Mohamed who was managing the Information and Management Department of the Mathare Youth Sports Association in another informal settlement in Nairobi. Barcott also reunited with the late Tabitha Atieno Festo, a registered nurse and resident of Kibera who had established a small medical clinic from a grant of $26 that Barcott had given her the previous summer to sell vegetables.

CFK received its initial funding from hundreds of American citizens in addition to a $30,000 start-up grant from the Ford Foundation. A year later, two undergraduates from the United States, Karen Austrian and Emily Verellen, volunteered in Kibera with CFK and helped young women in Kibera create CFK's third program, The Binti Pamoja (Daughters United) Centre, establishing a safe space for young girls to address issues unique to them. In 2007, the United Nations recognized the Binti Pamoja Centre as one of the world's premiere programs addressing the unique challenges and needs of adolescent girls.

CFK opened its first 24/7 medical clinic in 2002 and expanded its health program to include home health visits and health education through Community Health Volunteers (CHVs) and Youth Peer Providers (YPPs). CFK also launched its Sports for Development Program and established the first all-girls soccer team in Kibera in 2002, with the goal of bringing together male and female youth of different ethnicities to promote community cooperation, peace and conflict resolution and development through sports. In 2007, CFK expanded and relocated its clinic to the center of Kibera, renaming it the Tabitha Medical Clinic in honor of the late Tabitha Festo. In its first full year providing healthcare services in partnership with the U.S. Centers for Disease Control and Prevention (CDC), Tabitha Clinic provided healthcare services to Kibera residents through more than 35,000 patient visits, averaging about 140 visits daily. CFK also introduced a continuing medical education program and capacity building training programs and hired auxiliary doctors and nurses to be "on call" for the clinic in emergencies.  

To provide more holistic care for the Kibera community, CFK opened the Lishe Bora Mtaani Nutrition Centre in 2013, serving malnourished children under the age of five through an eight-week feeding and vitamin supplementation program. In 2018, CFK opened the new three-story Binti Pamoja Centre, housing arts, reproductive health education, and girls' empowerment activities for girls in the community. The centre also serves as CFK's center of operations.. After gaining community feedback, CFK expanded again in 2019, opening the Young Health and Wellness Centre to specifically serve the unique needs of youth in the community and the Tabitha Maternity Centre to serve the needs of mothers. During the COVID-19 pandemic, CFK partnered with the CDC and the Kenya Ministry of Health to lead coronavirus sampling and contact tracing efforts in Kibera.

External links

References

Foreign charities operating in Kenya
Youth organisations based in Kenya
Humanitarian aid organizations
Charities based in North Carolina
Organizations established in 2001
2001 establishments in North Carolina
2001 establishments in Kenya